Thomas Nathaniel Hibbard  (March 14, 1929 – February 11, 2016) was an American mathematician and computer scientist.

Thomas N. Hibbard received the B.S. degree in physics from Pacific University, Forest Grove, OR, in 1951, the M.S. degree in mathematics from the University of Illinois, Urbana, in 1954, and the Ph.D. degree in mathematics from the University of California, Los Angeles, in 1966.

From 1955 to 1958 T. N. Hibbard was a Scientific Programmer at the RAND Corporation, Santa Monica, CA, programming the JOHNNIAC, an early computer built by Rand, and from 1959 to 1965 a member of the research staff of the System Development Corporation, Santa Monica, CA, where he worked with Seymour Ginsburg and Joseph Ullian in automata theory and formal languages. Following a three-year visiting faculty appointment at the Catholic University of Salta, Argentina, he joined the University of Southern California, Los Angeles, as an assistant professor of Computer Science in 1970. He conducted research in searching, sorting, and data structures, helping to pioneer the field of analysis of algorithms.
In 1974, he started research with his then faculty colleague Armin B. Cremers, initiating the theory and applications of data spaces. In February 1976, he joined the staff of the Jet Propulsion Laboratory, Pasadena, CA, working on the Voyager, IRAS and Galileo projects until his retirement from JPL in 1986.  At that time, he joined the Information Sciences Institute (ISI), Marina del Rey, CA, and did experimental research on parallel computing until 1989, when he returned to Salta, Argentina, to teach at the National University (UNSA).

Contributions to Computer Science
Hibbard was a co-inventor of the binary search tree.
He first proposed the so-called Hibbard deletion for binary search trees,
in which the node to be deleted is replaced by its successor
.
Hibbard proposed one of several widely cited 
increment sequences for the 
Shellsort algorithm.

Selected publications

References

External links 
  Publications of Thomas N. Hibbard in the dblp computer science bibliography.

2016 deaths
1929 births
Computer scientists
20th-century American mathematicians
Pacific University alumni
21st-century American mathematicians
University of Illinois Urbana-Champaign alumni
University of California, Los Angeles alumni
RAND Corporation people
Jet Propulsion Laboratory faculty